"Wild Hearts" is a song by New Zealand-Australian country music singer Keith Urban. It was released on 19 August 2021 as the lead single from his upcoming twelfth studio album. Urban co-wrote the song with Brad Tursi, Eric Paslay and Jennifer Wayne, and produced it with Mitch Furr.

Background
Urban stated to fans via Instagram: "To all of the lost ones who aren't really lost ones, this song is for you. We are WILD HEARTS!" He also said in a press release: "I'm here to tell you anything can happen in this life if you got the heart and the passion and a God-lit fire inside." Joseph Hudak of Rolling Stone wrote that the song is "a classic tale of perseverance that preaches a message of not only pursuing your dreams but manifesting them" that alludes to some moments from Urban's life, including his "childhood memory of seeing Johnny Cash in concert with his father".

Critical reception
Matt Doria of NME called the song a "jammy, energetic country-pop track described aptly as 'quintessential Urban'".

Personnel
Adapted from the "Brown Eyes Baby" cassette booklet.

 Kip Allen – drums
 Rich Costey – mixing
 Mark Dobson – recording
 Mitch Furr – acoustic guitar, bass guitar, drum programming, production, recording synthesizer, twelve-string acoustic guitar
 Scott Johnson – production coordinator
 Randy Merrill – mastering
 Eric Paslay – background vocals
 Tyler Tomlinson – electric guitar
 Brad Tursi – background vocals
 Keith Urban – acoustic guitar, background vocals, bass guitar, ebow, electric guitar solo, production, vocals
 Jennifer Wayne – background vocals

Charts

Weekly charts

Year-end charts

Release history

References

2021 songs
2021 singles
Keith Urban songs
Songs written by Keith Urban
Songs written by Brad Tursi
Songs written by Eric Paslay
Capitol Records Nashville singles
Universal Music Group singles